Alexander Viktorovich Stranichkin (born 5 April 1955 in Chita, Zabaykalsky Krai) is an Abkhazian politician. A former vice-speaker of the People's Assembly of Abkhazia, Stranichkin currently serving as one of the four vice-premiers of the Republic of Abkhazia.

Biography
Stranichkin was born in Chita on April 5, 1955. He studied in Rostov, embarking on a career path as an economist.

Stranichkin was first elected to the People's Assembly of Abkhazia (Parliament) in 1996 for its thirteenth session in 1997 and was re-elected to its fourteenth session in 2002. He was serving his second term in the Assembly when he was named as vice-premier by Sergei Bagapsh. He was replaced as vice-speaker by Albert Ovsepyan, with Stranichkin's support.

On 15 June 2012, Stranichkin was re-elected as head of the Russian Community of the Republic Abkhazia.

References

1955 births
Living people
People from Chita, Zabaykalsky Krai
2nd convocation of the People's Assembly of Abkhazia
Vice Premiers of Abkhazia
3rd convocation of the People's Assembly of Abkhazia